Golf Australia is the governing body for the sport of golf in Australia, formed in 2006 after the Australian Golf Union (AGU) and Women's Golf Australia (WGA) agreed to merge. The decision, which was formally ratified at a meeting in Melbourne in August 2005, was made after the Australian Sports Commission threatened to withdraw its financial support unless the two bodies amalgamated. The Australian Sports Commission contributed approximately A$1.5 million annually to the Australian Institute of Sport for golf funding.

Colin Phillips, the AGU's executive director since 1978, retired from his position in 2005, claiming that the way the decision to merge had been forced upon the sport by the federal government, had been a factor in his decision.

Following the merger, IMG, the sports marketing company which organizes the Australian Open golf event, signed a three-year deal which increased its ties to Golf Australia. Former tennis pro and new Open chairman Paul McNamee also renegotiated a deal signed by the old AGU, whereby the tournament would be hosted at the Moonah Links course in Rye, Victoria three times in every five years. That decision had been heavily criticized by golf professionals who found issue with the course layout, low attendances and poor corporate interest, but the new organization was able to reduce its obligation to three tournaments before 2020.

Golf Australia runs the Australian Open and the Women's Australian Open, the premier male and female golf tournaments in Australia, as well as the Australian Amateur and other national amateur events. It also runs key programs promoting golf in Australia, the two major being the MYGolf for juniors and the Crown Lager Social Golf Club. Australian golfer Stuart Appleby is the ambassador for the Crown Lager Social Golf Club.

Golf Australia supports the state associations Golf New South Wales, Golf Northern Territory, Golf Queensland, Golf South Australia, Golf Tasmania, Golf Victoria & Golf Western Australia who are responsible for the governance, delivery and direction of golf in their State.

The Golf Australia National Squad is the key component of the countries High Performance program which supports talented young golfers. Squad members have included Geoff Ogilvy, Karrie Webb, Adam Scott, Aaron Baddeley, Michael Sim and Katherine Hull.

With golf being readmitted back into the Olympic fold at the 2016 Summer Olympics, the role of Golf Australia was strengthened further. As part of this the Australian Sports Commission raised the funding to the sport in April 2013.

Golf Australia owns and runs the Australian Handicapping system which operates throughout clubs nationally.

See also

 Golf in Australia
 Golf Australia National Squad
 Australian Open
 Women's Australian Open
 Australian Amateur
 Australian Women's Amateur
 Australian Boys' Amateur
 Australian Girls' Amateur

References

External links
 golf.org.au, Golf Australia official site
 MYGolf, official site
 Australian Open, official site
 Women's Australian Open, official site

Australia
Golf associations
Sports governing bodies in Australia
Golf in Australia
2006 establishments in Australia
Sports organizations established in 2006